Symphyotrichum yukonense (formerly Aster yukonensis) is a species of flowering plant in the family Asteraceae endemic to disjunct areas in Alaska and the Canadian territories of Yukon and Northwest Territories. Commonly known as Yukon aster, it is a perennial, herbaceous plant  in height. Its flowers have purple to blue ray florets and yellow to brown disk florets. It is a NatureServe Vulnerable (G3) species and is classified Imperiled (S2) in its Canadian range.

Citations

References

yukonense
Endemic flora of Canada
Flora of Subarctic America
Plants described in 1945
Taxa named by Arthur Cronquist